Tarrant is an unincorporated community located in the town of Lima, Pepin County, Wisconsin, United States. The community was named for the Tarrant family, who built a creamery in the area.

References

Unincorporated communities in Pepin County, Wisconsin
Unincorporated communities in Wisconsin